Bram Kohlhausen (born August 7, 1992) is a former quarterback for the TCU Horned Frogs. He is best known for leading the Horned Frogs to an Alamo Bowl victory over Oregon after trailing 31–0.

College career
As a walk-on senior having never started a game for TCU before, he helped TCU comeback from the largest deficit in NCAA bowl game history in the 2016 Alamo Bowl. Down 31–0 at halftime, Kohlhausen led the Frogs to a victory in triple-overtime against the Oregon Ducks.

In his first and only NCAA D1 start, he was the offensive MVP of the Alamo Bowl.

References
https://gofrogs.com/sports/football/roster/bram-kohlhausen/1184

Living people
1992 births
Houston Cougars football players
Los Angeles Harbor Seahawks football players
TCU Horned Frogs football players
American football quarterbacks